KSEL (1450 AM) is a radio station licensed to Portales, New Mexico, United States. The station, owned by Rooney Moon Broadcasting, serves the Clovis area and carries a Classic Country Music format.

History
The call letters KSEL were previously assigned to 93.7 FM (Now KLBB-FM) & 950 AM (Now KJTV-AM) Lubbock, Texas from 1956–1986.

References

External links

SEL
Adult standards radio stations in the United States
Radio stations established in 1982
1982 establishments in New Mexico
Portales, New Mexico